is a name given to an area of Ikebukuro, Tokyo, Japan that is a major shopping and cultural center for anime and manga aimed at women. The area is sometimes referred to as Fujoshi Street, referencing the name given to fans of yaoi.

Geography

Otome Road is located to the immediate west of Sunshine City, near Ikebukuro Station. Bordered by the Shuto Expressway, its boundaries are roughly defined as beginning at the Ikebukuro Animate Cafe and ending at the K-Books Cosplay Store. Several other stores focused on goods aimed at women are located further west in Ikebukuro, mainly concentrated around the flagship Animate store. As Otome Road is only a small area of a larger commercial district, it does not have frequenters who walk around in cosplay, and is not immediately distinguishable from other streets.

History
These stores and conventions were initially focused on general audiences; the area would not shift to a focus on female customers until 2000, following a renovation of Animate that shifted the products of the store to appeal to that demographic. That same year, K-Books in Ikebukuro  changed its product offerings to specialize in dōjinshi aimed at women. 

The area gained further visibility through the 2005 film Densha Otoko, which presented Otome Road as the female equivalent to Akihabara, another popular location for otaku.

Notable locations
Comic Toranoana and Mandarake both operate Otome Road locations specializing in goods aimed at women. In 2005, a butler café opened on Otome Road.

Otome Road additionally contains multiple household goods, cosmetics, and clothing stores, particularly stores specializing in otome-kei fashion.

See also
 Shōjo manga
 Tourism in Japan
 Yaoi

References

External links

"Otome Road and Doujinshi"

Otaku
Neighborhoods of Tokyo
Shopping districts and streets in Japan
Ikebukuro
Streets in Tokyo